Foissac is the name of 2 communes in France:

 Foissac, in the Aveyron department
 Foissac, in the Gard department